Events from the year 1726 in Canada.

Incumbents
French Monarch: Louis XV
British and Irish Monarch: George I

Governors
Governor General of New France: Charles de la Boische, Marquis de Beauharnois
Colonial Governor of Louisiana: Pierre Dugué de Boisbriand
Governor of Nova Scotia: John Doucett then Lawrence Armstrong
Governor of Placentia: Samuel Gledhill

Events
 Claude-Thomas Dupuy took up his duties as intendant of New France.
 Charles de la Boische, Marquis de Beauharnois was appointed as Governor of New France.
 Thomas-Jacques Taschereau arrived in New France (Canada) as a private secretary to the Intendant of New France, Claude-Thomas Dupuy.

Births
 June 24 : Robert Monckton, army officer and colonial administrator (died 1782)

Full date unknown
Robert Prescott, Governor of Canada (died 1815)

Deaths
 July 27 : Étienne de Carheil, missionary.

Date unknown
 Étienne Jacob, court officer.

Historical documents
Governor, intendant and bishop of Quebec are to cooperate (each within his bounds) to implant religion and aid trade (Note: "savage" used)

Lt. Gov. Dummer reports 1725 "Treaty of Pacification with[...]all the Tribes of Indians[...]engaged in the late warr with this Government"

Penobscot spokesman Loron tells Dummer that "Canada Indians" (Nanrantsouak and others) want to treat with New England at Montreal

Loron mentions proposal to have English withdraw from some sites, but Dummer rejects it along with Montreal meeting

Penobscot tell Dummer they have no memory of selling land he claims by deed and right, which he says can be settled in court

After signing treaty ratification, Penobscot agree to protect frontier settlers and to ratify treaty at Annapolis Royal

Dummer hopes Indigenous people "may in a short time be intirely drawne from their dependance on the French" for presents

Chiefs and representatives of "St. Johns, Cape Sable" and other nations ratify treaty of 1725 at Annapolis Royal

Treaty is signed by Indigenous people on flag bastion at Annapolis Royal after hearing it read in English and French

Lt. Gov. (of Annapolis) Doucett says Indigenous people signing "seem to be quite tired of the warr and are extreamly well pleas'd"

Lt. Gov. (of Nova Scotia) Armstrong reports Acadians will avoid swearing allegiance by leaving, perhaps for St. John's Island

Acadian Deputies sign oath only after clause added in margin of document "Whereby they might not be Obliged to Carry Arms"

"Dread of the pirates is always a great interruption to the Fishery" - Admiralty asked for warship to cruise Nova Scotia's Atlantic coast

Nova Scotia reports extensive trade by New Englanders and province's French with Île-Royale, "as if they were still Proprietors"

Crown urged to select 200,000 acres of Nova Scotia forest (for naval use), so British settlers can then come in and outnumber Acadians

Lt. Gov. Armstrong reports accomplishments and challenges, ranging from peace to defence to food provisions (Note: "savages" used)

Armstrong enlarges on defence issues following report that "Canada Indians" are coming to "commence a new warr"

Nova Scotia Council orders man to maintain child he fathered after midwife says mother "in her most Violent Pains" swore it was him

In Newfoundland, "there are no persons to administer justice during the winter season, except at Placentia and Canso"

English town with fishing interest in north and northwest Newfoundland wants survey of its "dangerous and utterly unknown" waters

Trade council wants Newfoundland survey "as it will greatly increase the cod fishery [and encourage and establish] the salmon fishery"

"I hope more effectual tho' less severe" - New York governor reports replacing prohibition on trade with Canada with increased duty

New York's issues with French fort at Niagara reveal complex relations with Canada and sometimes divided Six Nations

French fort at Niagara violates treaty, says New York governor to Commander in Chief in Canada, who denies it is British land

"Two French-men and three Indians[...]from the Eastward" sentenced to death for piracy in Boston special admiralty court

Maine soldier is only man able to interpret for "Cape-Sable Indians" accused of piracy (and found guilty)

References 

 
Canada
26